Barleria repens, the small bush violet, is a plant in the family Acanthaceae. It occurs in forests and woodlands from tropical Africa to South Africa.

External links
Barleria repens Nees, PlantZAfrica.com

repens